Hồ Đắc Điềm (1899–1985) was the governor of Ha Dong, the area surrounding Hanoi. He was also a successful lawyer and was the only non-French professor at the University of Indochina.

References

Vietnamese politicians
1899 births
1985 deaths
20th-century Vietnamese lawyers